Dorofeyevo is a rural locality (a village) in Lavrovskoye Rural Settlement, Sudogodsky District, Vladimir Oblast, Russia. The population was 38 as of 2010. There are 3 streets.

Geography 
Dorofeyevo is located 13 km north of Sudogda (the district's administrative centre) by road. Myzino is the nearest rural locality.

References 

Rural localities in Sudogodsky District
Sudogodsky Uyezd